RepliWeb, Inc. is a computer software manufacturer that develops Web content deployment, file synchronization, managed file transfer, and SharePoint application lifecycle services. It’s headquarters is in Coconut Creek, Florida, with other office locations in London, United Kingdom and Petah-Tikva, Israel.

Company history
RepliWeb was founded in 2000 to provide services for distributed file replication and Web application deployment automation. In 2005, RepliWeb acquired Softlink Ltd, adding various products such as file transfer system to its portfolio.

In September 2011, RepliWeb was acquired for $7.8 million by Attunity, a Boston, Massachusetts–based developer of data management.

In May 2019, Attunity was acquired by Qlik Technologies Inc., based in King of Prussia, PA.

References

Further reading

External links
 Attunity RepliWeb for Application Release Automation - ARA (formerly RepliWeb R-1d)
 How to replace RepliWeb with an MFT Replacement after End of Service - Coviant Software

Companies based in Broward County, Florida
Companies established in 2000
Software companies based in Florida
Software companies of Israel
Companies based in Petah Tikva
Defunct software companies of the United States